Gordon Seaton (born September 1, 1945) is a footballer who played as a midfielder in the Football League for Chester.

References

1945 births
Living people
People from Highland (council area)
Association football midfielders
Scottish footballers
Hibernian F.C. players
Berwick Rangers F.C. players
Rhyl F.C. players
Chester City F.C. players
Runcorn F.C. Halton players
Scottish Football League players
English Football League players